Sachin Dalpethado (born 8 February 1996) is a Sri Lankan cricketer. He made his Twenty20 debut for Negombo Cricket Club in the 2017–18 SLC Twenty20 Tournament on 24 February 2018. He made his List A debut for Negombo Cricket Club in the 2017–18 Premier Limited Overs Tournament on 16 March 2018.

References

External links
 

1996 births
Living people
Sri Lankan cricketers
Kalutara Town Club cricketers
Negombo Cricket Club cricketers
Place of birth missing (living people)